Bridgeton Township may refer to:
 Bridgeton Township, Michigan
 Bridgeton Township, Pennsylvania

Township name disambiguation pages